Chester Township is located in Logan County, Illinois. As of the 2010 census, its population was 669 and it contained 298 housing units. Chester Township changed its name from Madison Township sometime prior to 1921.

Geography

Demographics

References

External links
US Census
City-data.com
Illinois State Archives

Townships in Logan County, Illinois
Townships in Illinois